Thomas Fairbairn was an art collector.

Thomas Fairbairn may also refer to:

Thomas McCulloch Fairbairn (1840–1874), Ontario lawyer and political figure
Thomas McCulloch Fairbairn (inventor), inventor of miniature golf
Sir Thomas Gordon Fairbairn, 4th Baronet (1854–1931), of the Fairbairn baronets

See also
Fairbairn